Mikkel Brondum Andersen is a Danish speedway rider, born 31 July 1996, Fjerritslev, Denmark. He currently rides for the Redcar Bears having joined them in 2018.  In 2016 he won the Nordic U-21 Speedway Championship. He is the younger brother of  Jonas B Andersen. His official website is: http://www.brondumracing.com/

References 

1996 births
Living people
Danish speedway riders
People from Jammerbugt Municipality
Sportspeople from the North Jutland Region